Alexis Bœuf (born 4 March 1986 in Chambéry) is a retired French biathlete. First World Cup podium was in Antholz-Anterselva Individual 21 January 2010. He won Presque Isle pursuit in February 2011, his only World Cup victory. He announced his retirement during the 2014–15 season after the sprint in Hochfilzen.

He is a color analyst during biathlon World Cup broadcast on French L'Équipe (TV channel).

Biathlon results
All results are sourced from the International Biathlon Union.

Olympic Games

World Championships
4 medals (3 silver, 1 bronze)

World Cup

Individual victories
1 victory

Relay victories
4 victories

References

External links
 
 
 
 

1986 births
Living people
French male biathletes
Sportspeople from Chambéry
Biathlon World Championships medalists
Olympic biathletes of France
Biathletes at the 2014 Winter Olympics
Université Savoie-Mont Blanc alumni